Calcio Montebelluna is an Italian association football club located in Montebelluna, Veneto. It currently plays in Serie D.

History 
The club was founded in 1919 as U.S. Montebellunese.

Serie C2 
From the season 1981–82 to 1986–87 it has played in Serie C2.

Serie D 
In the season 2003–04 it was promoted from Eccellenza Veneto to Serie D where currently plays.

Colors and badge 
Its colors are white and blue.

Players

Notable players

The following is a provisional list of international and notable former players of Montebelluna sorted by nationality:

 Valeriano Nchama
 Attilio Tesser

Honours
 Coppa Italia Dilettanti
 Winners: 1970–71

References

External links 
Official homepage

Football clubs in Italy
Football clubs in Veneto
Association football clubs established in 1919
Serie C clubs
1919 establishments in Italy